Gobindpur is a village in Shaheed Bhagat Singh Nagar district of in the Indian state of Punjab. it was originally known as Salaimpur, but later had its name changed to Gobindpur after Guru Hargobind visited it in the 17th century . The village is administrated by Sarpanch an elected representative of the village.

Demography 
As of 2011 Indian Census, Gobindpur had a total population of 2,072, of which 1,076 were males and 996 were females. Population within the age group of 0 to 6 years was 194. The total number of literates in Gobindpur was 1,538, which constituted 74.2% of the population with male literacy of 78.0% and female literacy of 70.2%. The effective literacy rate of 7+ population of Gobindpur was 81.9%, of which male literacy rate was 87.4% and female literacy rate was 76.1%. The Scheduled Castes population was 841, which is 40.6% of the total population. Gobindpur had 411 households in 2011.

Geography 
Gobindpur is approximately 329 km from Capital New Delhi, 106 km from the state capital Chandigarh, 109 km from Amritsar, 55 km from Jalandhar and 1493 km from Mumbai. It is in the northwest part of India; a few hundred kilometers south of Kashmir and to the west of the Himalayan foothills of Punjab and Himachal Pradesh. On a clear day, the snow-clad peaks of the Dhauladhar range are visible in the distant horizon. The Banga Railway station is located on the Jalandhar City . Jaijon Doaba Line of the Northern Railway at 13 km from Nawanshahr, 43 km from Jalandhar, and 45 km from Ludhiana. It is also linked by National Highway 344A with Nawanshahr and Phagwara Grand Trunk Road from Banga.

Education 
The village has a Punjabi medium, Government Senior Secondary School founded in 1950's.|List of Schools and Colleges in SBS Nagar district| The schools provide mid-day meal as per Indian Midday Meal Scheme
 and the meal prepared in school premises. As per Right of Children to Free and Compulsory Education Act the school provide free education to children between the ages of 6 and 14.

Sikh National College  and Guru Nanak College for Women are the nearest colleges.

Transport

By road
Gobindpur is connected to Banga with local buses available. There is a large network of government and private bus services of Punjab, Haryana, Chandigarh, Himachal Pradesh.

By rail
Banga railway station (BXB) is the nearest train station about 4km. however there some other railway station here
Jalandhar - JUC (50KM)
Phagwara - PGW (23km)
SBS Nagar - SBSN (19km)
Jaijon - JJJ (30km)
Garhshankar - GSR(16km)

By air
Nearby airports include:
Domestic Airport
Adampur Airport - AIP (34 km), is the nearest domestic airport
Sahnewal Airport, Ludhiana - LUH(64 km Via Apra-Banga Road)
International Airport
Chandigarh Airport - IXC(118.7 km)
Sri Guru Ram Dass Jee International Airport, Amritsar - ATQ(141.7 km)
Indira Gandhi International Airport, Delhi - DEL (364.2 km)

See also 
List of villages in India

References

External links 
 Tourism of Punjab
 Census of Punjab
 Locality Based PINCode

Villages in Shaheed Bhagat Singh Nagar district